Enrique "Kike" Sola Clemente (born 25 February 1986) is a Spanish retired footballer who played as a striker.

During a 13-year professional career, he amassed La Liga totals of 106 matches and 22 goals over nine seasons, representing Osasuna and Athletic Bilbao in the competition.

Club career

Osasuna
Sola was born in Cascante, Navarre. A product of CA Osasuna's youth system, he made his first-team and La Liga debut on 9 June 2007, coming on as a second-half substitute in a 5–0 away win against Real Betis and scoring twice.

On 16 July 2009, after having appeared rarely in the previous two seasons (also struggling with injuries and loss of form), Sola moved to Segunda División's CD Numancia on a season-long loan, as part of a deal that saw Carlos Aranda move in the opposite direction, permanently. On 18 January of the following year, after a negative experience – even when healthy, he did not make the list of 18 on several occasions – he terminated his contract with the Soria club and moved abroad, joining Levadiakos F.C. from Greece until June.

For the 2010–11 campaign, Sola was initially only fourth-choice behind Aranda, Walter Pandiani and newly signed Dejan Lekić, only starting to receive significant playing time after injuries to the first two. On 13 March 2011, in one of his first starts, he netted in a 3–1 home win against Racing de Santander, and added another in the following matchday, scoring from a backheel in a 4–0 win at Hércules CF.

Osasuna eventually escaped relegation, and Sola finished as the team's top scorer even though he featured in less than half of the matches. On 11 May 2011 he helped with a brace to a 3–2 home win against Sevilla FC, after his side trailed 0–2 at half-time.

Sola only played in seven scoreless games in 2011–12, being troubled by tendinitis problems for several months and eventually undergoing surgery in early March 2012, being sidelined until June. On 25 February 2013, the day of his 27th birthday, he played just 20 minutes after coming from the bench away against Levante UD, but netted the second goal in an eventual 2–0 triumph for his seventh of the season.

On 31 March 2013, Sola helped with a brace as Osasuna came from behind to win it 3–1 over Real Valladolid at the Estadio José Zorrilla.

Athletic Bilbao
In summer 2013, Sola joined Athletic Bilbao on a five-year contract with a €30 million buyout clause – he had already played youth football with the club, from ages 12–17. After spending four months recovering from injury he scored his first goal on 26 January 2014, closing the scoresheet in a 5–1 away win over former side Osasuna.

Sola played sparingly for the Lions, remaining an unused substitute as they lost the 2015 final of the Copa del Rey to FC Barcelona. Against the same opponent, in that year's Supercopa de España, he came in the 80th minute of the second leg at the Camp Nou and, within seven minutes was given a red card for a foul on Javier Mascherano; his team nonetheless won 5–1 on aggregate for his first major honour.

In December 2015, Sola scored in each leg of Athletic's 8–0 aggregate win over Real Balompédica Linense in the domestic cup. The following 15 January he moved abroad for a second time, joining English Football League Championship leaders Middlesbrough on a temporary basis until the end of the campaign and teaming up with several compatriots at the club, among them manager Aitor Karanka. His first appearance occurred on 6 February, as he started and played the first half of the 1–1 home draw against Blackburn Rovers.

On 31 August 2016, Sola joined Getafe CF on a season-long loan. However, late into the following transfer window, that deal was cancelled and he moved to fellow second division side Numancia in another temporary deal.

During his four-year spell at the San Mamés Stadium, Sola was rarely used. On 1 June 2018, citing a "lack of motivation", the 32-year-old retired from football.

International career
Sola won his first and only cap in the Spain under-21 team on 25 March 2008, playing the second half of the 5–0 home defeat of Kazakhstan for the 2009 UEFA European Championship qualifiers after replacing Bojan Krkić.

Honours
Athletic Bilbao
Supercopa de España: 2015

References

External links

1986 births
Living people
Spanish footballers
Footballers from Navarre
Association football forwards
La Liga players
Segunda División players
Segunda División B players
CA Osasuna B players
CA Osasuna players
CD Numancia players
Athletic Bilbao footballers
Getafe CF footballers
Super League Greece players
Levadiakos F.C. players
English Football League players
Middlesbrough F.C. players
Spain under-21 international footballers
Basque Country international footballers
Spanish expatriate footballers
Expatriate footballers in Greece
Expatriate footballers in England
Spanish expatriate sportspeople in Greece
Spanish expatriate sportspeople in England